Gert Kams (born 25 May 1985) is a retired Estonian professional footballer who played as a right back. From 2019 he works as a sporting director for Paide Linnameeskond.

Club career

Early career
Kams started out playing for hometown team Koeru before moving to Meistriliiga side Valga in 2005.

Flora
In 2006, Kams joined Meistriliiga club Flora. He helped Flora win two successive Meistriliiga titles in 2010 and 2011.

SJK
On 18 January 2013, Kams signed a two-year contract with Finnish club SJK. SJK won the 2013 Ykkönen and were promoted to the Veikkausliiga.

Return to Flora
On 27 October 2014, Kams rejoined his former club Flora. He was named as the club's captain ahead of the 2015 season. Kams went on to help Flora win Meistriliiga titles in the 2015 and 2017 seasons.

International career
Kams has represented Estonia at under-20 and under-21 levels.

He made his senior international debut for Estonia on 3 February 2007, in a 0–4 loss to Poland in a friendly. Kams scored his first international goal on 29 February 2012, in a 2–0 friendly victory over El Salvador. It was an unconventional goal as the ball deflected off his back.

Career statistics

Club

International

International goals
As of 19 July 2019. Estonia score listed first, score column indicates score after each Kams goal.

Honours

Club
Flora
Meistriliiga: 2010, 2011, 2015, 2017, 2019
Estonian Cup: 2007–08, 2008–09, 2010–11, 2015–16
Estonian Supercup: 2009, 2011, 2012, 2016

SJK
Ykkönen: 2013
Finnish League Cup: 2014

References

External links

1985 births
Living people
People from Järva Parish
Estonian footballers
Association football fullbacks
Association football midfielders
Esiliiga players
Meistriliiga players
FC Valga players
FC Flora players
Ykkönen players
Veikkausliiga players
Kakkonen players
Seinäjoen Jalkapallokerho players
Estonia youth international footballers
Estonia under-21 international footballers
Estonia international footballers
Expatriate footballers in Finland
Estonian expatriate sportspeople in Finland